Nila Tanzil  (born in Jakarta, April 29, 1976) is the founder of Taman Bacaan Pelangi a non-profit organization focused on promoting literacy in remote areas of eastern Indonesia. Nila holds a master's degree (MA in European Communication Studies) from the University of Amsterdam, in The Netherlands and a bachelor's in International Relations from Parahyangan Catholic University where she was named "Best Graduate of The Year".

Taman Bacaan Pelangi
Taman Bacaan Pelangi is a non-profit organization that builds children's libraries and promotes literacy in remote areas of eastern Indonesia. 
Nila opened the first Taman Bacaan Pelangi children's library in Roe Village, Flores, East Nusa Tenggara, Indonesia in 2009. As of April 2018, Pelangi had 82 libraries across 15 islands in eastern Indonesia, including libraries on East Nusa Tenggara, West Nusa Tenggara, South Sulawesi, Papua providing more than 105,300 children's books to some of the most remote villages in Indonesia. Nila hopes to inaugurate her 100th library and deliver her 250,000th children's book before the end of 2018. Taman Bacaan Pelangi focuses the eastern part of Indonesia because it is underdeveloped and lacks the infrastructure needed to give children access to international-standard books. More importantly, the illiteracy rate in parts of eastern Indonesia is staggeringly high, with more than 55 percent of 15-year-olds unable to understand what they read. In an effort to ensure that Taman Bacaan Pelangi is well-funded and sustainable, she founded Travel Sparks in 2015. Travel Sparks is a social enterprise that helps people from around the world "Travel With A Cause". With Travel Sparks, tourists can take part in a once in a lifetime voluntourism opportunity. In 2016, Nila published "Lembar-Lembar Pelangi," a non-fiction book that recounts her decision to quit her corporate career and answer the "call" to leave it all behind her to follow her dream of building libraries and promoting literacy in some of the most remote places in Indonesia.

Awards
Kartini Next Generation
10 EY Entrepreneur of The Year 2016 from Ernst & Young
10 Inspiring Women 2015 by Forbes Indonesia
Inspiring Woman in ICT for Community Development from the Ministry of Women Empowerment & Child Protection and the Ministry of Communication & IT
Nugra Jasadharma Pustaloka 2013 from the National Library of the Republic of Indonesia
Indonesia's Inspiring Youth & Women 2012 from Indosat
10 Iconic Women Indonesia

Fellowships
Nila is an inaugural fellow of the Equity Initiative Fellowship in 2016 and an Atlantic Fellow.
She is also an Eisenhower Fellow 2018.

References

External links
 Taman Bacaan Pelangi [Rainbow Reading Gardens] website
 Travel Sparks website

1976 births
Living people
Indonesian activists
Indonesian people of Chinese descent
Indonesian women activists
University of Amsterdam alumni